StandWithUs (SWU) (also known as Israel Emergency Alliance) is an international, right-wing pro-Israel advocacy organization StandWithUs has worked closely with the Israel Ministry of Foreign Affairs to promote Brand Israel. It was founded in 2001 Los Angeles by family therapist-turned-activist Roz Rothstein and her husband and is headquartered in the United States.

History
StandWithUs was founded in 2001 by Roz Rothstein, a family therapist in Los Angeles whose parents were Holocaust survivors. According to her, the inspiration for StandWithUs came during the Second Intifada; she thought that Israel didn't get the backing it deserved so she and her husband set up a group with the mission to educate others about Israel.

Due to her leadership of SWU, Rothstein has twice been named one of the 50 most influential Jews in America by The Forward, and the Jerusalem Post named her one of the 50 most influential Jews in the world in 2016.

In 2020, StandWithUs together with the Israeli American Council (IAC) led a non-partisan slate in the World Zionist Congress elections.

Organization 

Rothstein, who founded SWU in 2001, remains its executive director. In 2015, its board of directors included Naty Saidoff and  Adam Milstein.

SWU has a team of 80 lawyers who provide pro-bono legal services to students and faculty confronting anti-Semitism or "anti-Semitism disguised as anti-Zionism." Roberta P. Seid previously served as an education-research director.

SWU is a trade name or dba name of "Israel Emergency Alliance". According to Jewish Voice for Peace, Israel Emergency Alliance is an IRS-registered non-profit and SWU and Creative Community for Peace are alternate names for this entity.

As of 2022, it has 18 offices across the US and branches in Israel, France, the United Kingdom, Australia, Canada, South America, and South Africa.

Views 
The founder states the organization is non-partisan and takes no policy positions. According to authors Cronin, Marusek and David Miller, SWU does not believe the West Bank is occupied and supports Israeli settlements. The organization focuses on education and is active on American, Canadian, British, and Brazilian campuses. According to The Intercept, SWU "trains students in Israel advocacy, organizes opposition to resolutions of the Boycott, Divestment and Sanctions movement (BDS), and sponsors pro-Israel events." SWU has sponsored campus protests,  promoted billboard and poster campaigns for solidarity with Israel, and depicted Palestinian leaders and institutions as tutoring children to be terrorists.

The organization has worked with the Israeli government. In 2011, Danny Ayalon said SWU created leverage for the Israel Ministry of Foreign Affairs. The organization has been criticized both for toeing the line of right-wing government policies and its insistence that Jews agree with all official policies of the Israeli government. StandWithUS has been also identified as one of the "pro-occupation organizations" that since 2005 has propagated the Brand Israel public relations campaign run by the Ministry of Foreign Affairs. The campaign, launched to combat the momentum of the BDS campaign, has drawn accusations of pinkwashing with its efforts to portray "Israel as a sanctuary for LGBT folks surrounded by barbaric and homo phobic Arabs, particularly Palestinians."

For SWU, in Rothstein's view, supporters of Israel should support whatever government is elected in Israel: she denies that Zionists who are publicly critical of the state of Israel for its treatment of Palestinians are supportive of that country.  According to her, SWU does not advocate specific policy positions and its goal is merely "to counter the vicious anti-Israel, anti-Semitic propaganda campaign" by educating the public about Israel.

While SWU is often categorized as right-wing, Rothstein denies that the organization would be either right or left. In an interview with Haaretz she claimed that "[w]e [SWU] don't take a position, we inform." However, she acknowledged having a soft spot for the Israeli settlements: "I do have an emotional attachment to Judea and Samaria. It’s where the Jewish people began, and I would be disingenuous if I told you I didn’t care," referring to the West Bank as "Judea and Samaria".

In terms of its position within a large range of American Jewish pro-Israeli movements, sociologist Dov Waxman says that  StandWithUs lies on the right wing of the spectrum of American Jewish groups, together with such groups as The David Project,  the Zionist Organization of America, the  Israel Project, and the Jewish Institute for National Security of America.

Ian Lustick has argued that StandWithUs manipulates statistics on Palestinian demography in order to buttress continued Israeli occupation and settlement of the West Bank.

SWU is opposed to J Street, a self-declared "dovish" pro-Israel lobby; In a debate with J Street President Jeremy Ben-Ami, Rothstein accused him of thinking that he knows "better than the Israelis" on how to achieve peace with the Palestinians. She also complained that J Street primarily pressures and criticizes Israel and not the Palestinians. Ben-Ami faulted her for taking a black-and-white approach to the conflict and concluded that there was little common ground between them. Rothstein is also opposed to Breaking the Silence, an organization of former Israeli soldiers opposed to the occupation of Palestinian lands.

SWU actively opposes the Boycott, Divestment and Sanctions (BDS) movement. SWU is a proponent of anti-BDS laws, and does not believe such laws impinge on the First Amendment-protected freedom of speech. These laws are intended to discourage boycotts of Israel by requiring state contractors to promise that they aren't boycotting Israel.

Pro-Israel activism training 

SWU offers two one-year programs to train students in Israel activism. According to Haaretz journalist Judy Maltz, no organization can compare with SWU for turning up 'the heat on the Israel-Palestinian debate at universities,' and its tactics in doing so are 'controversial. It distributes pamphlets and “fact sheets” on Israel, sets up pro-Israeli lectures, and has conducted nation-wide tours for Israeli army veterans while opposing Jewish communities who organize speaking tours of Israeli soldiers who speak out against the occupation.

SWU established and funds its own network of “fellows”, 'foot soldiers' trained to use cameras, videos, and robots to film events that are considered anti-Israeli at institutions of higher learning, and whose role is said to be one of acting as SWU's 'eyes and ears' on campuses. Often, according to Maltz, the presence of SWU activists 'planted' at anti-Israeli demonstrators, whether designedly or not, have provoked clashes that, in her view, serve SWU's interests. In training sessions, 'true/false' 'facts' are discussed. For example, the proposition 'Israeli settlements in the West Bank are legal' is deemed to be 'true', though Israel is the only country to assert this, against international law. Likewise, the Palestinian exodus in 1948 was not related to the establishment of Israel, but to the invasion by Arab armies, a position contested by Israeli historians.

The Emerson Fellowship program, created in 2007, trains college student leaders, known as "Emerson Fellows," to "act as campus emissaries of the Jewish state [Israel]." As of 2020, the program is offered to North American, British, and Brazilian students. The number of students enrolled in the program has grown from 38 in 2007 and 2008 to 107 in 2020.

The other program, the StandWithUs High School Internship created in 2012, is directed at North American high school students in 11th and 12th grade and had 125 students enrolled in 2020.

Shagririm 
Shagririm (meaning "ambassadors") was an educational program directed at young adult Israeli-Americans in southern California. The intent of the program was to connect such individuals to generate pro-Israeli initiatives. As of 2012, the program included 54 individuals from southern Californian universities. In contrast to Emerson Fellows, Shagririm was only open to Israeli-Americans.

The program was sponsored by and run through the Milstein Family Foundation's Israel Leadership Council, later rebranded as the Israeli-American Council.

StandWithUs TV 

In 2020, StandWithUs launched a new platform called "StandWithUs TV".  With the global Covid-19 pandemic impacting in-person activities, SWU decided to move more of its focus into the digital realm. Roz Rothstein described the new platform as producing content to "...inform and inspire people of all ages."

The first shows they're producing include:
 Standing with Israel
 Combatting Antisemitism
 Jewish Refugees in the Middle East
 Walk Through Israel.

Guests have included British Chief Rabbi, Lord Sacks and Israeli Ambassador to the UK, Mark Regev.

Campaigns and activities

Caterpillar shareholder resolution (2005)

Four Roman Catholic orders of nuns and the pro-Palestinian group Jewish Voice for Peace planned in 2005 to introduce a resolution at a Caterpillar shareholder meeting. The resolution asked for an investigation into whether Israel's use of the company's bulldozer to destroy Palestinian homes conformed with the company's code of business conduct. In response, SWU urged its members to buy Caterpillar stock and to write letters of support to the company. Representatives of SWU also planned to attend the shareholder meeting and speak out against the resolution. SWU and other Jewish organizations stated that Israel was being unfairly singled out.

Mahmoud Ahmadinejad protest (2007) 

In September 2007, SWU sponsored a protest against Columbia University in New York which had invited Iranian President Mahmoud Ahmadinejad to speak as part of their World Leaders Forum. SWU Campus Director Dani Klein said that inviting Ahmadinejad went "above and beyond the issues of free speech" and that giving him a platform was "honoring him."  University President Lee Bollinger defended the decision to invite Ahmadinejad as giving the students a chance to hear an adversary's views.

Transit poster campaign (2007)

In May 2007, the pro-Palestinian U.S. Campaign to End the Israeli Occupation placed 20 poster ads in the Washington, D.C. subway system showing a tank with its turret pointing at a child with a school bag. The text on the poster read: "Imagine if this were your child's path to school. Palestinians don't have to imagine." SWU in response launched its own ad campaign with posters showing Palestinian children with military gear. "Teaching children to hate will never lead to peace," one ad read.

Campus Post (2008)
In collaboration with the Jerusalem Post, StandWithUs began publishing a monthly newspaper, Campus Post, in 2008, to be distributed on university campuses. The short-lived paper included articles by Jerusalem Post writers on the topics of Israeli news, society, and culture, while students and others in North America contributed articles about pro-Israel activism.

Durban II protests (2009)

SWU organized protests against the Durban II conference in Geneva, Switzerland, in April 2009, which it claimed were anti-Israel. A small group rallied in New York and SWU sent 15 delegates to the conference itself. Three French students donned clown costumes and heckled Iranian President Mahmoud Ahmadinejad during his speech. According to Rothstein, the clown image was supposed to illustrate the absurdity of having countries that violate human rights at the event.

J Street (2009) 

SWU campaigned against a conference organised J Street in October 2009. The campaign consisted of emails, phone calls, and faxes to members of Congress denouncing J Street as "Jewish Stalinists," terrorist sympathizers, and "the surrender lobby", with literature accusing J Street of endorsing "anti-Israel, anti-Jewish narratives". J Street's president, Jeremy Ben-Ami, hit back, claiming SWU engaged in "thuggish smear tactics."

The campaign was not perceived to be effective in discouraging policymakers from attending, given the conference's greater-than-expected turnout. The attendees included many congressmen as well as National Security Advisor General James Jones.

Disrupting Jewish Voice for Peace Meeting (2010) 

On November 14, Robin Dubner, Michael Harris, and 8 other SWU activists disrupted a local Jewish Voice for Peace (JVP) meeting in Berkeley. They heckled the speakers and prevented the meeting from taking place. One activist pepper-sprayed two JVP members but said that she was "physically attacked". JVP members said the pepper-spraying was unprovoked. The SWU activists said that the action was in retaliation to JVP members who had heckled Israel's Prime Minister Benjamin Netanyahu the week before. Harris said they acted as individuals and not as part of an organized SWU action.

Olympia Food Co-op lawsuit (2011–2018) 
In 2011, SWU helped organize the Olympia Food Co-op lawsuit. In 2010, the Board of Directors of the Olympia Food Co-op decided to institute a boycott of Israeli goods. Five co-op members, aided by SWU, sued, alleging that the board had acted beyond the scope of their authority and breached their fiduciary duties.  StandWithUs took credit for filing the case, stating that it was a byproduct of the partnership between StandWithUs and the Israeli Ministry of Foreign Affairs. According to Mondoweiss and Ali Abunimah, SWU denied running the case on behalf of the plaintiffs.

The court ruled in 2012 that the lawsuit was an illegal Strategic Lawsuit Against Public Participation (SLAPP). A decision that was upheld by the appeals court. In 2015, the Washington Supreme Court ruled that the state's anti-SLAPP law was unconstitutional and returned the case to the lower courts. In 2018, the court gave summary judgment finding the plaintiffs had no standing to bring a case because they failed to show the co-op was injured.

SJP amicus brief (2020) 

In 2016, Fordham University denied Students for Justice in Palestine's (SJP) application to become an official student group, with the Dean of Students saying that the group's goals "clearly conflict with and run contrary to the mission and values of the university."  SJP students filed a lawsuit which was successful in a lower court. The university filed an appeal in the Supreme Court of New York Appellate Division.

In 2020, SWU filed an amicus brief in support of Fordham University's position. SWU founder Roz Rothstein said that Fordham is one of the first universities to "recognize SJP's bigotry for what it is". In the brief, SWU argued that the courts had limited jurisdiction in terms of dictating the decisions of private universities. Additionally, SWU argued that the university's decision was consistent with Title VI of the Civil Rights Act, saying that SJP violated the IHRA definition of antisemitism.  The New York State Appellate Division ruled in Fordham's favor and overturned the earlier ruling.

UC Merced Professor Anti-Semitism Allegations (2020) 

SWU and the Center for Combatting Anisemitism sent a letter to UC Merced asking it to take action regarding a professor who made tweets they labeled as anti-Semitic.  One tweet had an image of the "Zionist Brain", in another tweet he wrote, "the Zionists and IsraHell interest have embedded themselves in every component of the American system, media, banking, policy." SWU expressed support for his constitutional right to free speech but expressed concerns that he'd publicly expressed hatred toward some of the people he was teaching. As of August 2021, a formal investigation is in process.

University of North Carolina Course (2021) 

SWU expressed concerns about a course being taught at the University of North Carolina by a Ph.D. student who they consider to be an anti-Israel activist.   The title of the course is "The Conflict Over Israel/Palestine."  One of the professor's tweets that was highlighted by the Jewish News Service said in part "Palestinians are being murdered for just being alive" and called the United States an "imperialist death cult". SWU asked the university to monitor his teachings, record the classes for the public, and asked that the title be changed to reflect the professor's bias on the topic.

According to the Intercept, after a pressure campaign by "right-wing pro-Israel websites and an advocacy group" an Israeli government official, Consul General to the Southeastern United States Anat Sultan-Dadon, also intervened. The university is allowing the class to proceed despite the concerns raised.

Condemnation of Paul Gosar (2021) 

SWU condemned Arizona Republican Congressman Paul Gosar and called on him to apologize for his role as the keynote speaker at the America First Political Action Conference (AFPAC). The conference was organized by white nationalists and Holocaust denier Nick Fuentes. The SWU CEO released a statement saying, "The appearance of a sitting U.S. member of Congress at a white-supremacist conference legitimizes racism and anti-Semitism."

Creative Community for Peace 

Creative Community for Peace (CCFP) is an apolitical, non-profit organization that brings together people in the entertainment industry in order to promote peace in the Israel/Palestine conflict.

Waiting for its non-profit status, CCFP partnered with SWU in order to be able to receive donations. According to tax experts, this is a legal and common practice. Critics question the choice of an apolitical group even temporarily partnering with a right-wing group and claim that CCFP might be a front for SWU activities.  The BDS group Adalah-NY wrote in a press release that some people sit on the boards of both organizations.  CCFP co-founder David Renzer says that CCFP has always operated independently.

Finances 

According to Cause IQ, SWU's revenue and expenses for the 2019 fiscal year were $17,848,945 and $13,935,408 respectedly. As of 2012, the Jewish Journal described SWU as "a $4 million-a-year operation". According to 2009 tax filings, over half of SWU's budget funds student activities on U.S. campuses.

Sheldon Adelson has also donated to SWU. SWU's educational program, the Emerson Fellowship, is funded by J. Steve and Rita Emerson. Another major donor was Adam Milstein who donated $851,500 to SWU between 2004 and 2016 according to The Intercept.

In 2009, nearly 15% of the group's budget went to the Israeli office, which trains 150 Israeli students each year in advocacy skills in conjunction with the Ministry of Foreign Affairs.

In January 2015, the investigative Israeli website The Seventh Eye reported that SWU would receive $254,000 from the Prime Ministers Office, to set up a "Social Media Ambassadors" program to educate young people on how to use social media to promote Israel. However, according to SWU, the project did not go ahead.

Controversies

General 
StandWithUs is a right-wing organization that has been accused of suppressing free speech.

Criticism 
According to Steven M. Cohen, Professor of Jewish Social Policy at Hebrew Union College, SWU's insistence that Jews support whatever official policy is announced by Israel is deleterious, and harms Israel, for, were it accepted, it would discourage American Jews from providing good advice to Israel or indeed from actively participating in the discourse on that country. The way forward is to engage with Zionists of all camps, from hilltop youth to far leftists in the movement.

In 2014 Israeli columnist Bradley Burston took SWU to task for what he considered question-begging assertions passed off as facts in materials used by the organization to teach college students about Israel. Both its assertions about the putative legality of settlements and the reasons why Israel refuses to allow Palestinians room for their capital in Jerusalem were in his view lies.

According to an October 2009 investigation by Inter Press Service, SWU has received funds from a "web of funders who support organisations that have been accused of anti-Muslim propaganda and encouraging a militant Israeli and U.S. foreign policy in the Middle East." SWU's director countered by stating, "Radical Islam has impacted the Middle East greatly. All this stuff comes from a very fundamentalist religious position and looking at it does not make you right- or left-wing."

According to David Theo Goldberg and Saree Makdisi in their 2009 work The Trial of Israel’s Campus Critics thirty-three organizations, including AIPAC, the Zionist Organization of America, the American Jewish Congress, the Jewish National Fund along with  StandWithUs, belong to the Israel on Campus Coalition. They state that these organizations are not interested in "the niceties of intellectual exchange and academic process. Insinuation, accusation, and defamation have become the weapons of first resort to respond to argument and criticism directed at Israeli policies."

The right-wing Zionist Organization of America (ZOA) criticized SWU in 2018 for claiming that Israel "officially supports the two-state solution". ZOA stated that Israel opposes a Palestinian state and slammed SWU's claim as "extremely harmful" and a "serious falsehood".

SWU has used Israel's policy on LGBT rights to promote Israel to anti-Zionists, and has also been accused of pinkwashing Israel to divert attention away from its human rights violations.

In November 2011, Nathan Guttman criticized SWU for toeing the line of the right-wing Israeli government. As examples, he mentioned SWU education materials describing the Israeli settlements as legal, and the 1948 Palestinian exodus as not being caused by Israel.

The 2016 report The Israel Lobby and the European Union by David Cronin, Sarah Marusek, and David Miller states that SWU works closely with the Israeli government, that they support Israeli settlements and do not believe the West Bank is occupied.

See also
 Christians United for Israel
 Hasbara Fellowships
 The David Project
 AMCHA Initiative
 Israel lobby in the United States
 Public diplomacy of Israel

Notes

References

Citations

Sources 

 
 
 
 
 
 
 
 
 
 
 
 
 
 
 
 
 
  *

External links
 Official website

Zionism in the United States
2001 establishments in the United States
Foreign policy political advocacy groups in the United States
Israel–United States relations
Non-governmental organizations involved in the Israeli–Palestinian conflict
Israel friendship associations
Zionist organizations
Jewish charities based in the United States
Organizations established in 2001
Jewish-American political organizations